Gregory William Ours (born October 29, 1963) is a former American football guard who played for three games for the Miami Dolphins in the 1987 National Football League season. He played college football at Muskingum University.

References 

1963 births
Living people
American football offensive guards
Muskingum Fighting Muskies football players
Miami Dolphins players
National Football League replacement players